Niassa is a province of Mozambique. It has an area of 129,056 km2 and a population of 1,810,794 (2017). It is the most sparsely populated province in the country. Lichinga is the capital of the province. There are a minimum estimated 450,000 Yao people living in Mozambique. They largely occupy the eastern and northern part of the Niassa province and form about 40% of the population of Lichinga, the capital of this province.

The Ruvuma River forms much of the northern boundary of the province with Ruvuma Region, Tanzania while Lake Niassa forms the western border of the province, separating it from Malawi. 75% of the province remains untouched by development, and remains free of landmines. The province shares the Niassa National Reserve with neighboring Cabo Delgado Province.

Districts
Niassa Province is divided into the 15 districts of:
Cuamba District
Lago District
Lichinga District
Majune District
Mandimba District
Marrupa District
Maúa District
Mavago District
Mecanhelas District
Mecula District
Metarica District
Muembe District
N'gauma District
Nipepe District
Sanga District

and the municipalities of:
Cuamba
Lichinga
Metangula

Demographics

Religion

Education 

In 1998, a provincial college was built in Lichinga to train teachers. Partially financed by the Irish Embassy in Maputo, it graduates 60 teachers a year. Apart from training teachers for local schools, the college offers primary school education to the local Lichinga community and works towards reducing the impact of HIV/AIDS in Niassa province.

References

External links
Niassa Province landmine assessment

External links
  Province of Niassa official site
  including information about districts

 
Provinces of Mozambique